Solid Steps is a studio album by the American jazz saxophonist Joe Lovano recorded in 1986 and released on the Jazz Club label. The album was re-released on the September label (CD September 05124) in 2003 with a different cover. The album is the Lovano's first official studio recording as a leader.

Track listing
"Solid Steps" – 5:30
"Who Knows" – 8:45
"H and C's Dance" – 8:00
"Straight Shot" – 6:09
"Lofritian Mode" – 5:50
"A Picture of Her" – 5:48
"Gustavia" – 5:21
"Benjamin" – 4:45
"Pretext" – 5:04
"Soulrole" – 4:57

Personnel
Hein Van de Geyn – bass
Dré Pallemaerts – drums
Bert Joris – flugelhorn, trumpet
Michel Herr – piano
Joe Lovano – saxophone

References

External links

Joe Lovano albums
1986 albums